The Sierra Chichinautzin volcanic field, also known as El Pedegral, is located in the Trans-Mexican Volcanic Belt,  approximately  from where the Cocos Plate subducts beneath the North American Plate.

Description
It is located within the Trans-Mexican Volcanic Belt, and is less than 40 km directly south of Mexico City.

The Sierra Chichinautzin, formed primarily of overlapping small cinder cones and shield volcanoes, creates a broad topographic barrier at the southern end of the Basin of Mexico that extends from the eastern flank of Nevado de Toluca to the western flank of Iztaccihuatl volcano. The volcanic field contains more than 220 Pleistocene-to-Holocene monogenetic vents.

The best-known eruption occurred about 1670 radiocarbon years ago from the Xitle scoria cone, NE of the Volcán Ajusco lava-dome complex, which at  forms the highest peak of the Sierra Chichinautzin. The Xitle eruption produced a massive basaltic tube-fed lava flow that covered agricultural lands as well as pyramids and other structures of Cuicuilco and adjacent prehispanic urban centers.

See also
List of volcanoes in Mexico
Sierra de Ajusco-Chichinauhtzin

References

External links

Mountain ranges of Mexico
Trans-Mexican Volcanic Belt
Landforms of Mexico City
Landforms of the State of Mexico
Milpa Alta
Volcanic fields
Volcanoes of Mexico City
Volcanoes of the State of Mexico